War at the Warfield is a concert video by Slayer which was released on July 29, 2003, through American Recordings. Recorded at Warfield Theatre in San Francisco, California, on December 7, 2001, it is the band's second video album. The DVD's contents were announced by MTV on July 25, 2003. It is the last release by Slayer with drummer Paul Bostaph (before he came back in 2013), who left due to a chronic elbow injury. Bostaph was subsequently replaced by the original Slayer drummer Dave Lombardo. War at the Warfield was well received by critics, debuting at number three on the Billboard DVD chart, and sold over 7,000 copies in its first week. It was certified gold by the Recording Industry Association of America (RIAA) for selling over 50,000 copies in the United States. It also won a 2003 Metal Edge Readers' Choice Award for DVD of the Year.

Recording and release
The video was recorded at the Warfield Theatre in San Francisco on December 7, 2001. War at the Warfield was Slayer's second DVD. Originally set for release on February 11, 2003, and later February 13, 2003, it was delayed several times, due to unspecified "production issues". However, on May 20, 2003, it was announced that the release would be on June 17, 2003, only to be pushed back once again to July 27. Before the DVD's release, Tom Araya commented, "I don't think it's different than any other Slayer show, you got your kids doing the mosh stuff. They get crazy, they tear the place up. And then you get the one kid that's tempted to jump off the balcony. Whether he does it or not is another story. When they do, of course they get hurt, but they always insist on staying so they can watch the rest of the show, then they go to the emergency room." On July 25, 2003, four days before its release, MTV announced the DVD's contents.

Bostaph's departure
Bostaph gave the band prior knowledge of his willingness to leave before recording the DVD. "You gotta understand that the taping of that; the Warfield show was two shows before my last show with the band. I haven't watched it because you kinda go back with your scene... for the fans, they see a show; for me, I see my second to last show with the band, you know what I mean? I have it but I needed to get some distance away from the situation and move on with my life. It's like breaking up with a girlfriend."

Bostaph eventually left the band before Christmas due to a chronic elbow injury, saying it would hinder his ability to play. After his departure, Bostaph joined the band Systematic. On December 21, 2001, it was announced that the original drummer, Dave Lombardo, would "temporarily reclaim his place behind the drums on the next leg" of Slayer's God Hates Us All tour. Bostaph described his time with the band as "an unbelievable ride with Slayer, playing with these guys has been an incredible high point in my career", and that he is "really grateful for the experience".

Reception
Released through Universal Music & Video Distribution, the DVD entered the Billboard DVD chart at number three, selling over 7,000 copies in its first week. On June 2, 2004, the DVD was certified gold by the RIAA for more than 50,000 shipments in the United States. William Ruhlmann of Allmusic commented that the DVD "serves as both a fan's statement on Slayer and a good representation of the group's music and performance style." Jon Wiederhorn, an editor for MTV, said that "Slayer's new War at the Warfield DVD isn't one of those home-video concert releases meant to distract fans during a lengthy gap between records—the group already has ten songs written for its next LP, which should be out by April."

Andy Patrizio of IGN awarded the DVD seven out of ten, mentioning "the ferocity and intensity is still there, just a tad slower," and summarising with the statement, "if you're a Slayer fan, or into thrash in general, you'll love this. If you're not, this video isn't going to change your opinion on the music." Patrizio criticized the video's direction, observing that "the camerawork is full of fast, MTV-style cuts, which, combined with the flashing lights, is more headache-inducing than the music."

Track listing 
 "Disciple" (Jeff Hanneman, Kerry King)   
 "War Ensemble" (Tom Araya, Hanneman)   
 "Stain of Mind" (Hanneman, King)   
 "New Faith" (King)   
 "Postmortem" (Hanneman)   
 "Raining Blood" (Hanneman, King)   
 "Hell Awaits" (Hanneman, King)   
 "Here Comes the Pain" (King)   
 "Die by the Sword" (Hanneman)   
 "Dittohead" (King)   
 "Bloodline" (Araya, Hanneman, King)   
 "God Send Death" (Araya, Hanneman)   
 "Dead Skin Mask"  (Araya, Hanneman)   
 "Seasons in the Abyss" (Araya, Hanneman)   
 "Captor of Sin" (Hanneman, King)   
 "Mandatory Suicide" (Araya, Hanneman, King)   
 "Chemical Warfare" (Hanneman, King)   
 "South of Heaven" (Araya, Hanneman)   
 "Angel of Death" (Hanneman)

Personnel
This list of credits can be verified by Allmusic and War at the Warfields album-notes.

Tom Araya – bass guitar, vocals
Jeff Hanneman – guitars
Kerry King – guitars
Paul Bostaph – drums
Vincenzo Amato – production assistant
David Anthony – producer, design
Eric Baecht – remote technician
Greg Bess – sound consultant
Anthony Bongiovi – director, editing, camera operator
Eric Braverman – voices, producer
Marcus Buick – control engineer
David Caprio – production assistant
Rod Carmona – producer, design
Scott Carroll – tape operator
Jerry Cell – engineering supervisor
David Chun – camera operator
Jean Luc Cohen – producer, design
Robert Cohen – editing, camera operator
Leonard Contreras – engineer
John Crane – technician
Matthew Dillon – producer, design
Christopher Downing – producer, design
Jeff Fura – production coordination
CJ Furtado – engineer
Ken "TJ" Gordon – guitar technician, bass guitar technician
Glenis S. Gross – executive producer
Chuck Haifley – crew
Sam Harden – lighting
Matt Harmon – camera operator
Matt "Fluffy" Hartman – guitar technician
Jim Henderson – reprocessing
Kieran Hughes – camera operator
Tom Hutten – producer, design
Matt Hyde – mixing
Jessica Jenkins – producer
Nick John – executive producer
Ted Kujawski – engineer
Craig Lacombe – producer, design
Chris "Lumpy" Lagerborg – drum technician
Ann Lakato – camera operator
Christian Lamb – camera operator
Tony Leone – producer, design
Alex Lokey – photography
Gabe Lopez – camera operator
James C. Moore – producer, design
Christine Ogu – remote technician
Dino Paredes – executive producer
Lionel Passamonte – liner note producer
Sue Pemberton – producer, design
Rick Sales – executive producer
Greg Santos – camera operator
Thomas Scott – production assistant
Bob Skye – engineer
Bruce Smith – video engineer
David Stelzer – executive producer
Matthew Thayer – camera operator
Frank Vu – production assistant
Joe Weir – technician
Mark Weiss – photography

Certifications

References

External links

2003 video albums
2003 live albums
Live video albums
Slayer live albums
Slayer video albums
American Recordings (record label) live albums
American Recordings (record label) video albums